Methylobacterium fujisawaense is a facultatively anaerobic, Gram-negative, rod-shaped bacteria. It is catalase-positive and oxidase-negative. It produces pink-pigment on microbiological agar media (TSA and R2A, etc.). This bacteria is facultatively methylotrophic and is widely distributed in nature. They can be isolated from soil and on occasion freshwater environments, including drinking water.

Commonly, M. fujisawaense bacteria is not established as pathogenic; however, rarely it may cause human infection/disease, mostly in immunocompromised patients.

References

External links
Type strain of Methylobacterium fujisawaense at BacDive -  the Bacterial Diversity Metadatabase

Hyphomicrobiales
Gram-negative bacteria
Bacteria described in 1988